Puerto Bolívar Airport  is a private airport in the Guajira Department of Colombia. The closest city is Uribia. It is located next to the Cerrejón coal terminal and only serves the workers of the area. Only private sector aircraft and Colombia's Aerocivil land at Puerto Bolivar. No commercial airlines serve the airport and it is mostly empty.

See also
Transport in Colombia
List of airports in Colombia

References

External links
OpenStreetMap - Puerto Bolívar
OurAirports - Puerto Bolívar
SkyVector - Puerto Bolívar
FallingRain - Puerto Bolívar Airport

Airports in Colombia
Buildings and structures in La Guajira Department